Mickey J. Meyer is an Indian music composer and singer known for his works predominantly in Telugu Cinema. He has received two Filmfare Awards South, and three state Nandi Awards for the Best Music Direction. An alumnus of Trinity College of Music, Meyer started his career in 2005 and composed music for films such as  Happy Days (2007), Kotha Bangaru Lokam (2008) leader (2010) and A Aa (2016).

Discography

 The films are listed in order of the music release, regardless of the film release.

{| class="wikitable sortable"
! Year !! Film !! Language !! Notes
|-
| 2005 || Pothe Poni || Telugu ||
|-
| rowspan="2" |2006 || 10th Class || rowspan="2" | Telugu ||
|-
| Notebook || 
|-
| 2007 || Happy Days || Telugu || Winner, Filmfare Best Music Director Award (Telugu)Winner, Nandi Award for Best Music Director
|-
| rowspan="2" |2008 || Hare Ram || rowspan="2" | Telugu ||
|-
| Kotha Bangaru Lokam || Winner, Filmfare Best Music Director Award (Telugu)Winner, Nandi Award for Best Music Director
|-
| rowspan="3" |2009 || Ganesh || Telugu ||
|-
| Jolly Days || rowspan="2" | Kannada || Remake of Happy Days
|-
| Cheluvina Chilipili || Remake of Kotha Bangaru Lokam
|-
| rowspan="3" |2010 ||Maro Charitra|| rowspan="2" | Telugu ||
|-
| Leader || Nominated, Filmfare Best Music Director Award (Telugu)
|-
| Inidhu Inidhu || Tamil || Remake of Happy Days
|-
| 2011 ||Anaganaga O Dheerudu|| rowspan="3" | Telugu || Only one song; "Chandamamala"
|-
| rowspan="3" |2012 || Life is Beautiful || Nominated; Filmfare Best Music Director Award (Telugu)
|-
| Routine Love Story ||
|-
|Tor Naam || Bengali || Only one song; "Janeman Janejah" (Bengali Version of "Nijanga Nenena")
|-
| 2013 || Seethamma Vakitlo Sirimalle Chettu || rowspan="6 | Telugu || Only songsNominated; Filmfare Best Music Director Award (Telugu)
|-
| rowspan="3" |2014 || Chandamama Kathalu ||
|-
| Chakkiligintha ||
|-
| Mukunda ||
|-
| rowspan="3" |2015 || Kerintha || 
|-
| Subramanyam For Sale|| 
|-
| Buguri || Kannada ||
|-
| rowspan="3" |2016 || Brahmotsavam || rowspan="14" | Telugu || Only songs
|-
| A Aa || Nominated; Filmfare Best Music Director Award (Telugu)Winner, Nandi Award for Best Music Director
|-
| Okka Ammayi Thappa ||
|-
| rowspan="2" |2017 || Shatamanam Bhavati || Nominated; Filmfare Best Music Director Award (Telugu)
|-
| Mister ||
|-
| rowspan="2" |2018 || Mahanati|Winner; B. Nagi Reddy Award for Best Music Composer – MahanatiNominated: Filmfare Best Music Director - Mahanati (Telugu)
|-
|Srinivasa Kalyanam|
|-
| rowspan="3" |2019
|Oh! Baby|
|-
|Gaddalakonda Ganesh|
|-
|Iddari Lokam Okate|
|-
| rowspan="3" |2021
|Pitta Kathalu|Only for Meera segment
|-
|Sreekaram |
|-
|Shyam Singa Roy|
|-
|2023
|RamaBanam
|#Gopichand30
|}

Awards
Nandi Awards
2007: Best Music Director – Happy Days2008: Best Music Director – Kotha Bangaru Lokam2016: Best Music Director – A AaFilmfare Awards South
2007: Best Music Director – Telugu – Happy Days2008: Best Music Director – Telugu – Kotha Bangaru Lokam''

CineMAA Awards

References

External links
 
 Mickey J Meyer Soundtracks at Raaga.com
 Interview

Indian male playback singers
Indian Christians
Telugu film score composers
Tamil film score composers
Kannada film score composers
Alumni of Trinity College of Music
Filmfare Awards South winners
Telugu playback singers
Singers from Andhra Pradesh
Film musicians from Andhra Pradesh
Living people
21st-century Indian composers
Indian male film score composers
21st-century Indian male singers
21st-century Indian singers
Year of birth missing (living people)